Ukrainian partisans may refer to:

 Ukrainian Insurgent Army during World War II
 Soviet partisans in Ukraine during World War II
 Partisans in the 2022 Russian invasion of Ukraine